The M1, also known as the Fahrettin Altay–Evka 3 Line, is the only active line of the İzmir Metro in İzmir, Turkey. The  line runs from Fahrettin Altay station in the west to Evka 3 station in the east, consisting of 17 stations. Construction of the first stage of line began in 1992 and was completed in 2000, consisting of 10 initial stations. 

Further extensions of the line since 2005 have been plagued by repeated construction delays and re-awarding of tenders. An eastern extension in 2012 and western extension in 2014 added another two and five stations to the line respectively. Plans exist for a further extension to Güzelbahçe in future.

All stations on the M1 are handicapped accessible. The line runs almost completely underground with the exception of six stations.

Construction

Bornova to Üçyol section (1992–2000) 
The construction of the M1 started in September 1992 with its foundation being laid in December 1994. The  Nenehatun tunnels (named after Nene Hatun) between Üçyol and Konak stations were constructed via the New Austrian tunnelling method (NATM), while the  Ümmühan Ana tunnels (named after the mother of Süleyman Demirel) between Konak and Basmane stations were constructed via the earth pressure balance tunnelling method. The rolling stock was delivered in August 1996. The first  section from Bornova to Üçyol stations was completed in April 2000. Consisting of 10 stations, it began service on 22 May 2000.

Üçyol to Fahrettin Altay section (2005–2014) 
In March 2005, a tender was awarded for the Üçyol–Fahrettin Altay section, a  extension to the west consisting of six new stations. The foundation of the extension was laid three months later and tunneling works commenced on 5 July 2005, with the extension slated to be completed in two years. However, when the contractor failed to fulfill their obligations, the İzmir Metropolitan Municipality sent a cease and desist letter to the company on 14 February 2006, subsequently cancelling the tender in November 2006. A new tender was announced on 23 January 2007 with an aim complete the extension by 31 October 2008. The tender was cancelled on 13 August 2009 after the contractor requested a 15-month extension. 

The İzmir Metropolitan Municipality issued a third tender in October 2009, but it was again cancelled by the Public Procurement Authority for unspecified reasons. The cancellation had occurred after a company's objection to the tender even though it had not been invited to the tender. Consequently, İzmir Metropolitan decided to complete the remaining construction using their own resources due to the possibility of a tunnel collapse if it were not concreted. The contractor then resumed work in February 2010 after the cancellation was turned down by the administrative court. 

On 18 June 2012, test runs began between İzmirspor and Hatay stations, opening to passengers service on 29 December 2012. Göztepe station entered service on 25 March 2014, with the last two stations on the extension, Poligon and Fahrettin Altay stations, opening their doors on 27 July 2014. The planned Güzelyalı station between these two stations was dropped from the project due to an underground stream.

Evka 3 to Bornova Merkez section (2007–present) 
Work on the Bornova–Bornova Merkez extension on the M1's eastern axis started in 2007. However, the section between Evka 3 and Bornova Merkez stations was delayed after the contractor company refused to do construction drawings. Constructing the section would have risked building damage as it was discovered during excavations that the soil contained clay and sand. The construction was fully stopped in 2008 after the contractor could not finish the extension and requested an additional year, which was rejected. A new tender was issued in October 2009 to finish the remaining work. However, that tender was cancelled by the Public Procurement Authority.

A third tender was made in April 2010, but it was cancelled by the municipality after the court reverted the cancellation of the second tender. The municipality signed an agreement with the winner of the second tender but the agreement was reverted after the high court reversed the decision of lower court about the second tender. A fourth tender was issued in August 2010 and construction started in September. Test drives started on 20 March 2012 for the  section to Evka 3. Evka 3 and Ege University stations began service on 30 March 2012.

Further extensions and plans 
The line is planned to be extended to Bornova district in the east and Güzelbahçe in the west, with further extensions still under planning.

Works on the  Fahrettin Altay–Kaymakamlık extension to the west began on 9 June 2018 and are scheduled for completion October 2022, at a cost of ₺1.027 billion. As of 25 January 2021, 90% of the tunneling work on the Fahrettin Altay– extension had been completed, and one of two tunnels on the extension was fully completed on 4 March. There are seven stations planned for the extension: Balçova, Çağdaş, Dokuz Eylül Üniversitesi Hastane, Güzel Sanatlar Fakültesi, Narlıdere, Siteler, and Kaymakamlık.

The M1 line will be further extended from Kaymakamlık, which is under construction, to Güzelbahçe. This  extension is planned to have another 11 stations.

Stations 

There are 17 stations on the M1 line, all with handicapped access. Most of the stations are underground with the following exceptions: Bölge, Halkapınar and Sanayi stations are at-grade; Hilal and Stadyum stations are on viaducts; and Bornova station is in a splitting tunnel.

As of September 2020, all stations charge a standard fare (₺4.7) from standard İzmirim Kart owners for the first ride.

Links to the transportation network include: transfer to İZBAN at both Halkapınar and Hilal stations; to ESHOT and  buses via Bornova, Evka 3, Fahrettin Altay, Halkapınar, Konak and Üçyol stations; to İZDENİZ ships via Konak station; TCDD Taşımacılık trains via Basmane station; and to Konak Tram via Fahrettin Altay, Halkapınar and Konak.

Trains 
The M1 opened in 2000 with 45 wagons. In 2011, the wagon number was increased to 77 with 8 train sets from China consisting of 32 wagons. 10 more wagons were added in 2015, increasing the number to 87. 19 train sets consisting of 95 wagons were delivered in 2017, increasing the total to 182. Each train set consisted of three wagons at first; however, this number increased to four, then five.

Accidents 
In 2015, the escalators at Üçyol station broke down, resulting with 14 injuries.

In 2016, a train collided with a container that fell onto the rails near Bölge station, injuring 10 people. The train tilted over as a result of the collision.

In 2019, a construction worker died after his arm was crushed during the construction in Narlıdere.

References

External links 

 İzmir Metro official site
 İzmir Metropolitan Municipality official site

İzmir Metro
Standard gauge railways in Turkey
Railway lines opened in 2000
Railway lines opened in 2012
Railway lines opened in 2014